Claudinei Cardoso Félix Silva, (born December 6, 1985 in Bragança Paulista), known as Nei, is a Brazilian right back who last played for Brazilian team Paraná.

Career
On 22 December 2009 Sport Club Internacional officialized the purchase of right backwing, who was formerly playing for Atlético-PR, the deal between Nei and the Brazilian club is due to last until December 2012.

Nei scored his first goal for Internacional on 23 February 2010 in Copa Libertadores match versus Club Sport Emelec. He played for Internacional at the 2010 FIFA Club World Cup.

On December 4, 2012, after 157 games and 5 goals, Nei didn't renewed his contract with Internacional Porto Alegre, and then is currently unattached.

Honours
Atlético Paranaense
Campeonato Paranaense: 2009

Internacional
Copa Libertadores: 2010
Campeonato Gaúcho: 2011, 2012
Recopa Sudamericana: 2011

References

External links
 sambafoot.com 
 rubronegro.net 
 CBF 
  furacao.com 
 zerozero.pt 
 tiochambinho.com.br 

1985 births
Living people
Brazilian footballers
Sociedade Esportiva Palmeiras players
Clube Atlético Bragantino players
Associação Atlética Ponte Preta players
Sport Club Corinthians Paulista players
Sport Club Internacional players
Club Athletico Paranaense players
CR Vasco da Gama players
Campeonato Brasileiro Série A players
Association football defenders
People from Bragança Paulista